Hallfield Primary School is a two–form-entry co-educational primary school housed in a building of architectural distinction. It is a grade II* listed building in Inverness Terrace on the Hallfield Estate in London, built in 1953–1955 and designed by Denys Lasdun.

Architectural history
The original school designed by Denys Lasdun in the 1950s had become overcrowded by the 1970s. In 2005, new funding allowed two new buildings designed by Caruso St John to be added. These were a RIBA Award Winner in 2006.

References

External links
 

Denys Lasdun buildings
Grade II* listed buildings in the City of Westminster
Primary schools in the City of Westminster
Community schools in the City of Westminster